Francisco Javier García de la Camacha Gutiérrez-Ambrossi (born 24 June 1984), better known as Javier Ambrossi, is a Spanish actor, stage, film and television director and writer. He is best known for creating and directing the musical La llamada and its film adaptation together with Javier Calvo, as well as the television series Paquita Salas and Veneno.

Early life 
Ambrossi was born in Madrid, he graduated in Journalism at the Complutense University of Madrid and studied Dramaturgy at the Real Escuela Superior de Arte Dramático. His younger sister, Macarena García, is also an actress.

Career 
Ambrossi has had supporting roles in a number of television series, including El comisario, Amar en tiempos revueltos, Sin tetas no hay paraíso, and Cuéntame cómo pasó.

Since 2013 he co-directs La llamada at the Teatro Lara in Madrid, a musical he created alongside Javier Calvo.

In August 2015, the Mexican production of La llamada opened at the López Tarso theatre in Mexico City, with a Mexican cast.

In July 2016 the web television series Paquita Salas, created by Ambrossi and Calvo, premiered on Flooxer. Due to the success of the series, Netflix acquired the rights to air the second season of the series.

In September 2017, the film adaptation of La llamada, directed by Ambrossi and Calvo, premiered in Spain.

Along with Calvo, Ambrossi was listed 47th in El Mundo's list of most important LGBT people in Spain in 2017.

From October 2017 to February 2018, Ambrossi and Calvo appeared on reality television talent competition Operación Triunfo as the teachers of acting in the "Academy".

In 2020, the Ambrossi and Calvo-created biographical television limited series Veneno aired on Atresplayer Premium and HBO Max. 

Since 2020, Ambrossi is a panelist for Mask Singer: Adivina quién canta, the Spanish version of the international music game show Masked Singer. On 1 March 2021, Ambrossi was announced as a judge for Drag Race España, the Spanish version of the television drag queen competition Drag Race.

Personal life 
Ambrossi has been in a relationship with actor and director Javier Calvo since 2010.

References

External links 
  

1984 births
Living people
Male actors from Madrid
Spanish male film actors
Spanish male stage actors
Spanish male television actors
Spanish gay actors
Spanish LGBT actors
LGBT film directors
LGBT television directors
LGBT theatre directors
21st-century Spanish male actors
Drag Race España
Spanish film directors
Spanish television directors
Spanish theatre directors
21st-century Spanish screenwriters